The 8th Academy Awards were held on March 5, 1936, at the Biltmore Hotel in Los Angeles, California and hosted by AMPAS president Frank Capra. This was the first year in which the awards were called "Oscars".

Despite receiving eight nominations, the most of the year, Mutiny on the Bounty became the last film to date to win Best Picture and nothing else (following The Broadway Melody and Grand Hotel), and the only film to receive three nominations for Best Actor.

This was the second and last year that write-in votes were permitted; A Midsummer Night's Dream became the only film to win a write-in Oscar, for Best Cinematography. Miriam Hopkins' Best Actress nomination for Becky Sharp was the first acting nomination for a color film.

The short-lived category of Best Dance Direction was introduced this year; it lasted just three years before the Directors Guild of America successfully lobbied for its elimination.

Winners and nominees 

Nominees were announced on February 7, 1936. Winners are listed first and highlighted in boldface.

Academy Honorary Award 

 D. W. Griffith – "For his distinguished creative achievements as director and producer and his invaluable initiative and lasting contributions to the progress of the motion picture arts".

Multiple nominations and awards 

The following thirteen films received multiple nominations:

 8 nominations: Mutiny on the Bounty
 7 nominations: The Lives of a Bengal Lancer
 6 nominations: The Informer
 5 nominations: Captain Blood
 4 nominations: Les Misérables, A Midsummer Night's Dream and Top Hat
 3 nominations: Broadway Melody of 1936, David Copperfield and The Dark Angel
 2 nominations: Alice Adams, Naughty Marietta and Gold Diggers of 1935

The following two films received multiple awards:

 4 awards: The Informer
 2 awards: A Midsummer Night's Dream

Trivia

A fictitious version of the 8th Academy Awards was a major scene in the 1937 film A Star Is Born, in which the character of Esther Blodgett (stage name Vicki Lester), played by Janet Gaynor, wins the Academy Award for Best Actress, only to have her inebriated husband, fallen movie star Norman Maine, played by Fredric March, crash the party and make a scene. Both Gaynor and March were real-life recipients of Academy Awards, for Best Actress and Actor respectively, and were nominated for their roles in said movie.

The film shows a ceremony similar to the real one of the day, much smaller and more private than the televised event that occurs today.

See also 

 1935 in film

References

Academy Awards ceremonies
1935 film awards
1936 in Los Angeles
1936 in American cinema
March 1936 events